Aleina Grace Edwards (born August 28, 1994) is an American fencer.   She placed 5th with the epée in the Youth 2009 Summer Nationals, and in the 2010 Junior Olympics. She has also participated in the European circuit.

References

External links 
 
 

1994 births
Living people
American female épée fencers
21st-century American women